Glen Miller (born August 23, 1963) is an American basketball coach, currently the head coach at University of Saint Joseph (Connecticut). He is the former head men's basketball coach at the University of Pennsylvania and Brown University and associate head coach at the University of Connecticut.

Head coaching record

References

External links
UConn bio

1963 births
Living people
American men's basketball coaches
American men's basketball players
Basketball coaches from Connecticut
Basketball players from Connecticut
Brown Bears men's basketball coaches
Connecticut College Camels men's basketball coaches
Northeastern Huskies men's basketball players
Penn Quakers men's basketball coaches
Place of birth missing (living people)
Saint Joseph Blue Jays men's basketball coaches
UConn Huskies men's basketball coaches
UConn Huskies men's basketball players